New Khartoum International Airport (Arabic:مطار الخرطوم الدولي الجديد) is an international airport under construction in Omdourman, Sudan, to be located 40 km (24.8 miles) from Khartoum's city centre.

History 
Completion is scheduled for 2022. This is planned to have two 4000 metre runways, a passenger terminal of 86,000 square metres and a 300-room international hotel. Construction is to be carried out by China Harbour Engineering Co. (CHEC).

References 

Official website

Airports in Sudan
Proposed airports in Africa